Thandie is a given name. Notable people with the name include:

People
 Thandie Galleta (born 1993), Malawian netball player
 Thandiwe Newton (born 1972), English actress formerly credited as Thandie Newton

Fictional characters
 Thandie Abebe, character on the British medical drama Holby City